Dental explorers, also known as sickle probes, are tools found in the dental arsenal that are frequently utilised. The explorer is designed with a sharp tip at the end to improve tactile perception.

In the past it was usual for dentists to use the explorer to probe teeth for the presence of cavities. Some dental professionals have questioned this practice intwenty-first century's first decadentury. The use of a sharp explorer to diagnose caries in pit and fissure sites is no longer recommended and clinicians instead should rely on "sharp eyes and a blunt explorer or probe." Penetration by a sharp explorer cause cavitation in areas that are remineralizing or that g or could be remineralized. Dental lesions initially develop a subsurface lesion. Early lesions may be reversed - with meticulous patient self-care and application of fluoride - as long as the thin surface layer remains intact. The use of a dental explorer with firm pressure to probe suspicious areas may result in the rupture of the surface layer covering early lesions. Instead, they argue that fluoride and oral hygiene should be used to remineralize the enamel and prevent it from decaying further. This continues because sometimes decay can be difficult to diagnose without tactile verification. Additionally, radiographs and other products designed to identify decay (such as measuring fluorescence from a laser) help the dental professional make a final diagnosis of tooth decay.

There are various types of explorers, though the most common one is the No. 23 explorer, which is also known as a "shepherd's hook". Other types include the 3CH (also known as "cowhorn" or "pigtail") and No. 17 explorers, which are useful for the interproximal areas between teeth.

References
Summit, James B., J. William Robbins, and Richard S. Schwartz.  "Fundamentals of Operative Dentistry: A Contemporary Approach."  2nd edition.  Carol Stream, Illinois, Quintessence Publishing Co, Inc, 2001.  .

Dental equipment